This article details the qualifying phase for modern pentathlon at the 2016 Summer Olympics. Thirty-six athletes per gender must qualify for the Games, with only a maximum of two each per NOC. Qualification methods are similarly applied to both men's and women's events.

Host nation Brazil has been guaranteed one quota place automatically, while two invitational positions are distributed by the UIPM once the rest of the qualifiers are announced and thereby decided.

The initial distribution of berths to the athletes based on competition results occur between January and August 2015. One place will be handily awarded to the winner of the 2015 UIPM World Cup final. Twenty places are determined by the continental championships: one each from Africa and Oceania, five from Asia, eight from Europe, and five from the Americas with a maximum of one quota per NOC (winners from NORCECA and South America, and top three from the 2015 Pan American Games in Toronto, Canada).

Three places have been reserved to the highest-ranked athletes at each of the 2015 and 2016 UIPM World Championships. The remaining seven will be awarded based on the pentathlon's world rankings, unless a reallocation of unused berths have been invoked before the deadline.

Men's
Individual athletes may qualify in any of the following methods, ensuring that an NOC may enter up to a maximum of two in each event. If more than two athletes are eligible to compete, a non-selected quota has been redistributed.

 ^ Unused quota place through the respective Continental Championships

Women's
Individual athletes may qualify in any of the following methods, ensuring that an NOC may enter up to a maximum of two in each event. If more than two athletes are eligible to compete, a non-selected quota has been redistributed.

 ° Unused host quota place
 ^ Unused quota place through the respective Continental Championships

References

External links
UIPM Rio 2016 Coverage

Qualification
Qualification for the 2016 Summer Olympics